Niwan O Gatpoh (born 1987) is an Indian football player. He is currently playing for Shillong Lajong FC in the I-League as a midfielder.

External links
 http://goal.com/en-india/people/india/32703/niwan-o-gatphoh
 http://www.indianfootball.com/en/statistic/player/detail/playerId/1224

Footballers from Meghalaya
1987 births
Living people
I-League players
Association football midfielders
Shillong Lajong FC players
People from Shillong
Indian footballers